Marin Ion (also known as Ion Marin; born 25 March 1955) is a Romanian football manager and former defender who currently manages Romania women's national under-19 football team.

Playing career
Marin started his football career as a defender with the youth team of Rapid Bucharest in 1971. A year later he joined Dinamo Bucharest, where he won 5 championship titles (1975, 1977, 1982, 1983 and 1984) and two Romanian Cups (1982, 1983). In the 1983–84 season, he reached with Dinamo the semi-finals of the European Cup, where they lost to eventual winners Liverpool.

He left the club after 13 years to join bitter rivals Rapid Bucharest, and eventually ending his career with the Bucharest-based club. He also had spells with Bihor Oradea and Victoria București. As a footballer he made over 300 appearances in Liga I.

Marin represented his country in the national U-21 and U-23 sides.

Managerial career
Marin has managed a number of teams in his native Romania, including the youth team of Dinamo Bucharest, Pandurii Târgu Jiu, Flacăra Moreni, Petrolul Ploiesti, Farul Constanţa, Astra Ploieşti, Dinamo Bucharest, Universitatea Cluj and Bihor Oradea (autumn 2002 and as of October 2005). His most successful spells in Romania was with Petrolul Ploiești taking over the team and win the Romanian Cup in the 1994–95 season, and participating in the UEFA Cup Winners' Cup. He also won his first league title with Dinamo Bucharest in the 2001–02 season. In October 2009, he took Al-Ettifaq from relegation, and qualified them in the AFC Champions League for two consecutive seasons. On 3 October 2011, the experienced coach signed a two-year contract with UAE Pro-League side Dubai Club. He resigned after a few months, causing him to join the reserve team of Dinamo București in 2012. In July 2012, Marin was hired as manager by Kuwait SC and during his first season in charge, he won the Kuwaiti Premier League and AFC Cup.

In 2013, he was named Kuwaiti Coach of the Year after winning his second AFC Cup title. In April 2014, Marin stepped down as head coach of Kuwait SC.

On 30 September 2014, he became the head coach of the United Arab Emirates club Al Dhafra. In January 2015 he parted ways with the club.

In April 2015, he returned for a short spell at Dubai CSC. In January 2016, he was appointed manager of Iraqi side Zakho FC replacing Ilie Stan.

In 2016, Marin was hired by Iraqi club Al-Mina'a SC, but stepped down in April 2017.

In May 2018, he moved back to Kuwait to coach Qadsia SC.

In February 2021 he was appointed to Romania's women under-19 national team.

Managerial statistics

Honours

Player
Dinamo Bucharest
Romanian League (5): 1974–75, 1976–77, 1981–82, 1982–83, 1983–84
Romanian Cup (2): 1981–82, 1983–84

Manager
Petrolul Ploiești
Romanian Cup (1): 1994–95

Dinamo Bucharest
Romanian League (1): 2001–02

Al-Kuwait
Kuwaiti Premier League (1): 2012–13
AFC Cup (2): 2012, 2013

Qadsia
Kuwait Super Cup (1): 2018
Kuwait Federation Cup (1): 2018–19

Individual
Kuwait Manager of the Year: 2013

References

External links
 

1955 births
Living people
People from Ilfov County
Romanian footballers
Association football midfielders
FC Dinamo București players
FC Bihor Oradea players
Victoria București players
FC Rapid București players
Romanian football managers
CS Pandurii Târgu Jiu managers
CSM Flacăra Moreni managers
FC Petrolul Ploiești managers
FCV Farul Constanța managers
FC Astra Giurgiu managers
FC Dinamo București managers
FC Bihor Oradea managers
FC Universitatea Cluj managers
Ettifaq FC managers
Dubai Club managers
Kuwait SC managers
Al-Mina'a SC managers
Qadsia SC managers
Romanian expatriate football managers
Romanian expatriate sportspeople in Saudi Arabia
Expatriate football managers in Saudi Arabia
Romanian expatriate sportspeople in the United Arab Emirates
Expatriate football managers in the United Arab Emirates
Romanian expatriate sportspeople in Kuwait
Expatriate football managers in Kuwait
Romanian expatriate sportspeople in Iraq
Expatriate football managers in Iraq
AFC Cup winning managers
Kuwait Premier League managers